The 2019 Forge FC season was the first season in the club's history, as well as first season in Canadian Premier League history. On April 27, 2019, Forge FC hosted York9 FC in the inaugural CPL match at Tim Hortons Field. During the season, Forge also participated in the Canadian Championship, CONCACAF League, and the Canadian Premier League Finals.

On November 2, 2019, Forge FC defeated Cavalry FC 2–0 on aggregate in the CPL Finals and became the first ever champions of the Canadian Premier League. As champions, they qualified for the 2020 CONCACAF League.

Squad
As of November 2, 2019.

Transfers

In

Transferred in

Loaned in

Draft picks 
Forge FC selected the following players in the 2018 CPL–U Sports Draft on November 12, 2018. Draft picks are not automatically signed to the team roster. Only those who are signed to a contract will be listed as transfers in.

Out

Transferred out

Club

Kits
On September 28, 2018, the Canadian Premier League announced that Canadian Soccer Business had signed a "long-term" deal on behalf of the league with Italian sporting apparel company Macron to be the official league kit provider, supplying the league's clubs with bespoke playing kits and training gear.

On April 5, 2019, Forge FC's home and away kits were unveiled alongside those of the CPL's other team's. The club later unveiled a black and gold third kit on May 30 to commemorate the sporting history of Hamilton.

Supplier: Macron / Sponsor: Tim Hortons

Pre-season

Matches

Competitions 
Match times are Eastern Daylight Time (UTC−4).

Overview

Canadian Premier League

Spring season

League table

2019 CONCACAF League qualification table

Results summary

Results by match

Matches

Fall season

League table

Results summary

Results by match

Matches

CPL Finals

Canadian Championship

CONCACAF League

Preliminary round

Round of 16

Statistics

Squad and statistics 

|-

 

|-
! colspan="16" | Player(s) transferred out during this season
|-

|}

Top scorers 
{| class="wikitable sortable alternance" style="font-size:85%; text-align:center; line-height:14px; width:85%"
|-
!width=10|Rank
!width=10|Nat.
! scope="col" style="width:275px;"|Player
!width=10|Pos.
!width=80|CPL Spring season
!width=80|CPL Fall season
!width=80|CPL Finals
!width=80|Canadian Championship
!width=80|CONCACAF League
!width=80|Total
|-
|1|||| Tristan Borges        || MF || 4 || 8 || 1 || 0 || 0 ||13
|-
|2|||| Anthony Novak        || FW || 2 || 4 || 0 || 0 || 0 ||6
|-
|rowspan=2|3|||| Kyle Bekker        || MF || 1 || 3 || 0 || 1 || 0 ||5
|-
||| Chris Nanco        || FW || 1 || 3 || 0 || 0 || 1 ||5
|-
|rowspan=2|5|||| David Choinière        || MF || 0 || 1 || 1 || 0 || 2 ||4
|-
||| Emery Welshman        || FW || 1 || 2 || 0 || 1 || 0 ||4
|-
|7|||| Kadell Thomas        || FW || 2 || 1 || 0 || 0 || 0 ||3
|-
|rowspan=3|8|||| Elimane Oumar Cissé        || MF || 0 || 2 || 0 || 0 || 0 ||2
|-
||| Jace Kotsopoulos        || FW || 1 || 1 || 0 || 0 || 0 ||2
|-
||| Daniel Krutzen        || DF || 1 || 0 || 0 || 0 || 1 ||2
|-
|rowspan=6|11|||| Klaidi Cela        || DF || 0 || 1 || 0 || 0 || 0 ||1
|-
||| David Edgar        || DF || 0 || 1 || 0 || 0 || 0 ||1
|-
||| Giuliano Frano        || MF || 1 || 0 || 0 || 0 || 0 ||1
|-
||| Jonathan Grant        || DF || 0 || 1 || 0 || 0 || 0 ||1
|-
||| Monti Mohsen        || DF || 0 || 1 || 0 || 0 || 0 ||1
|-
||| Marcel Zajac        || FW || 0 || 1 || 0 || 0 || 0 ||1
|-
|colspan="4"|Own goals      || 1 || 0 || 0 || 0 || 0 ||1
|-
|- class="sortbottom"
| colspan="4"|Totals||15||30||2||2||4||54

Top assists 
{| class="wikitable sortable alternance" style="font-size:85%; text-align:center; line-height:14px; width:85%"
|-
!width=10|Rank
!width=10|Nat.
! scope="col" style="width:275px;"|Player
!width=10|Pos.
!width=80|CPL Spring season
!width=80|CPL Fall season
!width=80|CPL Finals
!width=80|Canadian Championship
!width=80|CONCACAF League
!width=80|Total
|-
|1|||| Kwame Awuah        || DF || 2 || 3 || 0 || 0 || 1 ||6
|-
|rowspan=2|2|||| Kyle Bekker        || MF || 3 || 2 || 0 || 0 || 0 ||5
|-
||| Tristan Borges        || MF || 1 || 4 || 0 || 0 || 0 ||5
|-
|rowspan=2|4|||| David Choinière        || MF || 1 || 0 || 0 || 3 || 0 ||4
|-
||| Anthony Novak        || FW || 0 || 3 || 0 || 0 || 1 ||4
|-
|6|||| Marcel Zajac        || FW || 1 || 2 || 0 || 0 || 0 ||3
|-
|rowspan=5|7|||| Alexander Achinioti-Jönsson        || MF || 1 || 1 || 0 || 0 || 0 ||2
|-
||| Elimane Oumar Cissé        || MF || 0 || 1 || 1 || 0 || 0 ||2
|-
||| Daniel Krutzen        || DF || 2 || 0 || 0 || 0 || 0 ||2
|-
||| Chris Nanco        || FW || 0 || 1 || 1 || 0 || 0 ||2
|-
||| Emery Welshman        || FW || 2 || 0 || 0 || 0 || 0 ||2
|-
|rowspan=5|12|||| Klaidi Cela        || DF || 0 || 1 || 0 || 0 || 0 ||1
|-
||| Giuliano Frano        || MF || 0 || 0 || 0 || 0 || 1 ||1
|-
||| Jonathan Grant        || DF || 0 || 1 || 0 || 0 || 0 ||1
|-
||| Dominic Samuel        || DF || 0 || 1 || 0 || 0 || 0 ||1
|-
||| Kadell Thomas        || FW || 0 || 1 || 0 || 0 || 0 ||1
|-
|- class="sortbottom"
| colspan="4"|Totals||13||22||2||2||3||43

Clean sheets 
{| class="wikitable sortable alternance" style="font-size:85%; text-align:center; line-height:14px; width:85%"
|-
!width=10|Rank
!width=10|Nat.
! scope="col" style="width:275px;"|Player
!width=80|CPL Spring season
!width=80|CPL Fall season
!width=80|CPL Finals
!width=80|Canadian Championship
!width=80|CONCACAF League
!width=80|Total
|-
|1|||| Triston Henry || 4 || 3 || 2 || 0 || 2 ||11
|-
|2|||| Quillan Roberts || 1 || 3 || 0 || 0 || 0 ||4
|-
|- class="sortbottom"
| colspan="3"|Totals||5||6||2||0||2||15

Disciplinary record 
{| class="wikitable sortable alternance" style="font-size:85%; text-align:center; line-height:14px; width:85%"
|-
!rowspan="2" width=10|No.
!rowspan="2" width=10|Pos.
!rowspan="2" width=10|Nat.
!rowspan="2" scope="col" style="width:275px;"|Player
!colspan="2" width=80|CPL Spring season
!colspan="2" width=80|CPL Fall season
!colspan="2" width=80|CPL Finals
!colspan="2" width=80|Canadian Championship
!colspan="2" width=80|CONCACAF League
!colspan="2" width=80|Total
|-
! !!  !!  !!  !!  !!  !!  !!  !!  !!  !!  !! 
|-
|1||GK|||| Triston Henry    ||0||0||2||0||1||0||0||0||2||0||5||0
|-
|2||DF|||| Jonathan Grant    ||0||0||2||0||0||0||0||0||0||0||2||0
|-
|4||DF|||| Dominic Samuel    ||4||0||1||1||0||0||0||0||0||0||5||1
|-
|5||DF|||| Daniel Krutzen    ||0||0||0||0||0||0||1||0||0||0||1||0
|-
|6||DF|||| Kwame Awuah    ||0||0||3||0||1||0||0||0||0||0||4||0
|-
|7||MF|||| David Choinière    ||0||0||0||0||1||0||0||0||0||0||1||0
|-
|8||MF|||| Giuliano Frano    ||1||0||4||0||0||0||1||0||1||0||7||0
|-
|9||FW|||| Marcel Zajac    ||1||0||2||0||0||0||0||0||0||0||3||0
|-
|10||MF|||| Kyle Bekker    ||2||0||0||0||0||0||0||0||0||0||2||0
|-
|11||FW|||| Chris Nanco    ||0||0||1||0||0||0||0||0||0||0||1||0
|-
|13||MF|||| Alexander Achinioti-Jönsson    ||0||0||0||0||0||0||1||0||0||0||1||0
|-
|14||FW|||| Emery Welshman    ||0||0||1||0||0||0||0||0||0||0||1||0
|-
|17||FW|||| Kadell Thomas    ||3||0||1||0||0||0||0||0||0||0||4||0
|-
|18||GK|||| Quillan Roberts    ||0||0||0||0||0||0||0||1||0||0||0||1
|-
|19||MF|||| Tristan Borges    ||0||0||2||0||0||1||0||0||1||0||3||1
|-
|21||DF|||| Bertrand Owundi    ||2||0||2||0||0||0||0||0||1||0||5||0
|-
|22||DF|||| Monti Mohsen    ||0||0||1||0||0||0||0||0||0||0||1||0
|-
|23||FW|||| Anthony Novak    ||1||0||2||0||1||0||0||0||0||0||4||0
|-
|30||DF|||| David Edgar    ||0||0||1||0||0||0||0||0||0||0||1||0
|-
|- class="sortbottom"
| colspan="4"|Totals||14||0||25||1||4||1||3||1||5||0||51||3

Honours

Canadian Premier League Awards

References

External links 
2019 Forge FC season at Official Site

2019
2019 Canadian Premier League
Canadian soccer clubs 2019 season
2019 in Ontario